In mathematics, a Kolmogorov automorphism, K-automorphism, K-shift or K-system is an invertible, measure-preserving automorphism defined on a standard probability space that obeys Kolmogorov's zero–one law.  All Bernoulli automorphisms are K-automorphisms (one says they have the K''-property), but not vice versa.  Many ergodic dynamical systems have been shown to have the K-property, although more recent research has shown that many of these are in fact Bernoulli automorphisms.

Although the definition of the K-property seems reasonably general, it stands in sharp distinction to the Bernoulli automorphism.  In particular, the Ornstein isomorphism theorem does not apply to K-systems, and so the entropy is not sufficient to classify such systems – there exist uncountably many non-isomorphic K-systems with the same entropy.  In essence, the collection of K-systems is large, messy and uncategorized; whereas the B-automorphisms are 'completely' described by Ornstein theory.

Formal definition
Let  be a standard probability space, and let  be an invertible, measure-preserving transformation.  Then  is called a K-automorphism, K-transform or K-shift, if there exists a sub-sigma algebra  such that the following three properties hold:

Here, the symbol  is the join of sigma algebras, while  is set intersection. The equality should be understood as holding almost everywhere, that is, differing at most on a set of measure zero.

Properties
Assuming that the sigma algebra is not trivial, that is, if , then   It follows that K-automorphisms are strong mixing.

All Bernoulli automorphisms are K-automorphisms, but not vice versa.

Kolmogorov automorphisms are precisely the natural extensions of exact endomorphisms, i.e. mappings  for which  consists of measure-zero sets or their complements, where  is the sigma-algebra of measureable sets,.

References

Further reading
 Christopher Hoffman, "A K counterexample machine", Trans. Amer. Math. Soc.'' 351 (1999), pp 4263–4280.

Ergodic theory